The Goya Award for Best Original Song (Spanish: Premio Goya a la mejor canción original) is one of the Goya Awards, Spain's principal national film awards.

The award was first presented at the fifteenth edition with the first winner being the song "Fugitivas" written by Manuel Malou, Natboccara and JJ Chaleco for Miguel Hermoso's film of the same name.

Leiva has won the award twice.

Winners and nominees

2000s

2010s

2020s

References

External links
Official site
IMDb: Goya Awards

Goya Awards